C. J. Lewis (born Steven James Lewis, 1 February 1967) is a British reggae singer. His biggest hit single was the 1994 cover version of "Sweets for My Sweet".  The track was produced by Phillip Leo, as was his debut album, Dollars (UK No. 44). The vocals were performed by Samantha Depasois, a British vocalist who also sung on the tracks "Everything is Alright (Uptight)" and "Best of My Love", and provided the vocals for the album, Dollars. Leo co-wrote original material on Dollars, including "Dollars" (UK No. 34) and "R to the A" (UK No. 34).

Discography

Albums

Singles

References

External links
C.J. Lewis at Discogs

1967 births
Living people
20th-century Black British male singers
British reggae singers